Jesper Lindorff Juelsgård (born 26 January 1989) is a Danish professional footballer who plays as a centre-back for Danish 1st Division side FC Fredericia.

Club career
Juelsgård is a product of Midtjylland's football academy, which he joined from the childhood club Spjald IF. He was sent on a six-month loan to Skive IK in 2008 alongside fellow talent Christian Sivebæk. Upon his return to Midtjylland, he made his debut against AGF on 2 November 2008 as a starter, before being substituted in the 77th minute for Kim Christensen as his club lost 2–1. He managed to become a starter for the following years and he made a total of 144 league appearances for the club. He also won Player of the Year at the club for 2011.

On 7 July 2014, Juelsgård signed a three-year contract with French Ligue 1 club Évian.

He managed to stay with the French club for just over a year before signing a four-year agreement with Brøndby IF on 28 August 2015. After a promising start at Brøndby, Juelsgård gradually slipped out of the starting line-up on the team, and he then moved to AGF, just before the summer transfer window closed in 2016. He signed a three-year contract extension in June 2019.

On 22 February 2022, Juelsgård was sold to Icelandic club Valur. His contract was terminated in October 2022. On 12 January 2023, Juelsgård signed for Danish 1st Division side FC Fredericia on a deal until June 2024.

International career
Juelsgård made his debut for the Denmark national team on 15 August 2012 against Slovakia, where Denmark lost 1–3.

Honours

Club
Midtjylland
 Danish Superliga runner-up: 2007–08
 Danish Cup runner-up: 2009–10, 2010–11

AGF
 The Atlantic Cup: 2018, 2020

Individual
 Midtjylland Player of the Year: 2011

References

External links
Jesper Juelsgård at DBU

1989 births
Living people
Association football defenders
Danish men's footballers
Danish expatriate men's footballers
Denmark international footballers
Denmark under-21 international footballers
Denmark youth international footballers
People from Ringkøbing-Skjern Municipality
FC Midtjylland players
Skive IK players
Thonon Evian Grand Genève F.C. players
Brøndby IF players
Aarhus Gymnastikforening players
Valur (men's football) players
FC Fredericia players
Danish Superliga players
Ligue 1 players
Ligue 2 players
Expatriate footballers in France
Expatriate footballers in Iceland
Danish expatriate sportspeople in France
Danish expatriate sportspeople in Iceland
Sportspeople from the Central Denmark Region